Silifke Museum is in Silifke district of Mersin Province, Turkey.

History
The first museology activity in Silifke dates back to 1939. The findings in Silifke district which is rich in archaeological wealth were collected in a former primary school building which  itself is older than a century. After the museum building was constructed the museum was opened to public on 2 August 1973.

Exhibition
In the yard of the museum stonemasonry items are displayed including various types of  column headings, sarcophaguses, Moslem tombstones  etc. The building has four showrooms. In the showroom in the groundfloor there are various sculptures. The first room of the first floor is dedicated to ethnographic items mostly on Yörük life. In the other two rooms, handicrafts and ornaments are displayed.

Number of items
Earlier works are from the Neolithic age. Hellenistic, Roman, Byzantine, Seljuk and Ottoman works are also displayed.
Archaeologic:2975
Ethnographic:1410
Coin:15875
Seal:77

Gallery

References

Archaeological museums in Turkey
Ethnographic museums in Turkey
Museums in Mersin Province
Silifke District
Culture in Mersin
History of Mersin Province
1973 establishments in Turkey
Museums established in 1973